Nová Ves nad Váhom is a village and municipality in Nové Mesto nad Váhom District in the Trenčín Region of western Slovakia.

History
In historical records the village was first mentioned in 1419.

Geography
The municipality lies at an altitude of 180 metres and covers an area of 12.112 km². It has a population of about 517 people.

References

External links
 Official page
 www.statistics.sk (archive)

Villages and municipalities in Nové Mesto nad Váhom District